Between 1925 and 1990, Brown & Bigelow released for sale a yearly calendar for the Boy Scouts of America (BSA) featuring a painting by illustrators Norman Rockwell (from 1925 to 1976) and Joseph Cesatari (from 1977 to 1990). Rockwell missed only two years: 1928 and 1930; Cesatari completed a painting for every year. The paintings were used to show scouts of different kinds – Cub Scouts, Scouts BSA (Boy Scouts at the time), Venturing (Explorers at the time), Sea Scouts, and Air Scouts – engaging in mostly outdoor activities. Today a majority of the paintings, including Forward America and Beyond the Easel, are held in the collection of the National Scouting Museum. In 2020 as a part of the BSA's Chapter 11 bankruptcy filing, the organization listed the paintings as assets. The rest reside in private collections or the collections of museums such as The Children's Museum of Indianapolis.

The idea for the calendar series for the Boys Scouts of America was thought up by an unknown staff member at Brown & Bigelow in 1923. After seeing the positive effect on BSA recruitment by their use of Rockwell's paintings, the staff member wondered if Brown & Bigelow could help by publishing a calendar featuring one of his paintings. The BSA had used paintings donated to them by the American Red Cross, which had originally commissioned Rockwell paintings for The Red Cross Magazine. Later in 1923, James E. West, the Chief Scout Executive, agreed to Brown & Bigelow's proposal for a 1925 calendar with art first used for the Red Cross Magazine. They named the chosen painting, A Good Scout (it was originally titled A Red Cross Man in the Making). It shows a scout bandaging a foot of a spaniel puppy under the eye of its mother. Assuming the calendar would sell well, the BSA, Brown & Bigelow, and Rockwell worked out a deal for future calendars. Rockwell would paint his works years in advance so that the chosen work could also be used as the cover of Boys Life early in the year to advertise that year's BSA calendar. The calendars were large –  – and featured a single image for the year; users changed the months by tearing off a paper portion at the bottom.

Rockwell missed painting works for two early years of the calendar series – 1928 and 1930 – because he had too many other commissions. To prevent this from happening again and to control the content of the paintings, James E. West devised a yearly workflow. Early in the year, the BSA and Rockwell would both pitch ideas for a painting for a calendar two years in advance, and decide on the theme. While Rockwell was working in his studio, a member of the BSA's staff would visit to check the details of the painting. Every person depicted had to be the idealized version of a scout or scout leader, and every uniform had to be depicted correctly. The tents and other outdoors gear used by scouts in the paintings had to be the right type and could not look like army surplus. After the initial draft of the painting was finished, West and other BSA staff members sometimes found details to be corrected.

Between 1925 and 1976, Rockwell created 49 paintings for the BSA's Brown & Bigelow calendar. Every work, except for A Good Scout in 1925 (which had already been published in a magazine), was painted specifically for the calendar. Several of the paintings were used by the BSA for a secondary purpose –  to serve as the covers of its various handbooks. For example, three paintings – Spirit of America, The Scouting Trail, and Come and Get It – were reused as the cover illustration of the Boy Scout Handbook. The Adventure Trail was used as the cover art for the 1954 edition of the Den Chief's Handbook, and The Scoutmaster served as the cover of the 1960 edition of the Scoutmaster's Handbook.

After Rockwell retired in 1976, the BSA asked artist Joseph Cesatari to take over the calendar series. From 1969 to 1972, Cesatari was the art director in the advertising division of the BSA; he became the art director of Boys Life in 1973. Between 1977 and 1990, Cesatari created 14 paintings for the BSA's Brown & Bigelow calendar. Like Rockwell, he created all of the illustrations specifically for the calendar. None of Cesatari's paintings were reused for handbook covers. Due to declining sales, Brown & Bigelow cancelled the calendars in 1990; The Scoutmaster was the final painting created for the series.

Rockwell's illustrations

Cesatari's illustrations

References

Footnotes

Bibliography 

 
 
 
 

Boy Scouts of America
Scouting in art
Paintings by Norman Rockwell